The Julius Edgar Lilienfeld Prize of the American Physical Society, to remember Julius Edgar Lilienfeld, has been awarded annually, since 1989. (It was not awarded in 2002). The purpose of the Prize is to recognize outstanding contributions to physics.

Recipients 
Source: American Physical Society

External links 
  J. E. Lilienfeld Prize for Theoretical Particle Physics APS

See also
 List of physics awards

References

Awards established in 1988
Awards of the American Physical Society